Maegyo Station is a subway station of the Bundang Line, the commuter subway line of Korail, the national railway of South Korea. The station was opened in November 2013, as part of the final extension of the Bundang Line.

Seoul Metropolitan Subway stations
Railway stations opened in 2013
Metro stations in Suwon